Events from the year 1124 in Ireland.

Incumbents
 High King: Toirdelbach Ua Conchobair

Events
 Dún Bhun na Gaillimhe ('Fort at the Mouth of the Gaillimh') was constructed by the King of Connacht Tairrdelbach Ua Conchobair.

Births
 Tigernán Ua Ruairc, ruler of the Kingdom of Breifne

References